Hyun-jin Ryu (born March 25, 1987) is a South Korean professional baseball pitcher for the Toronto Blue Jays of Major League Baseball (MLB). He previously played in MLB for the Los Angeles Dodgers and in the KBO League for the Hanwha Eagles.

In 2013, after spending seven seasons with the  Eagles, he became the first player from the KBO to join an MLB team via the posting system. Ryu is the first Korean pitcher to start in a World Series game. In 2019, Ryu earned a selection to his first career Major League Baseball All-Star Game. During that season, he led the Majors in earned run average (ERA) and achieved an ERA of 1.26 through his first 14 starts, the lowest by a Dodgers pitcher since the statistic became official in 1912.

Early life and education
Ryu was born in Incheon, South Korea on March 25, 1987, and attended Incheon's Dongsan High School. He is working towards a master's degree in community physical education in Daejeon University. When Ryu was 10, his father bought him a lefthander's glove that goes on the right hand, so Ryu learned to pitch with his left hand.

Career

Amateur
In 2004, Ryu underwent Tommy John surgery and did not pitch in any official games. In 2005, he led his team to the Blue Dragon Open National High School Championship, pitching 22 consecutive scoreless innings as the team's ace and batting .389 in the tournament. He was named Best Pitcher.

In 2005, Ryu was selected for the South Korea national junior team that was runner-up in the 6th Asian Junior Baseball Championship in Seoul, South Korea. Ryu started the semifinal match against Chinese Taipei (Taiwan), and helped his team reach the final, recording ten strikeouts and giving up one unearned run on four hits in six innings. During the competition, he pitched  innings with 14 strikeouts, and gave up an unearned run on five hits in three games (one start).

He competed at the 60th National High School Baseball Championship in 2005, when as a third-year student in high school. In the game against Seongnam High School in the quarterfinals, he pitched a shutout, striking out 17.

Hanwha Eagles (2006–2012)
In July 2005, Ryu was selected by the Hanwha Eagles as the 1st pick in the second round of the 2006 KBO League Draft, and made his professional debut on April 12, 2006. In his rookie year of 2006, Ryu finished with an 18–6 win–loss record, a 2.23 ERA and 205 strikeouts in 201.2 innings pitched. He earned the pitching Triple Crown, and was eventually named both Rookie of the Year and Player of the Year. He became the only player in KBO history to win both the Rookie of the Year award and the MVP award in the same season.

In August 2008, Ryu competed for the South Korea national baseball team in the 2008 Summer Olympics, where they won the gold medal in the baseball tournament. In the team's third game of round-robin play, Ryu pitched a 1–0 complete game shutout victory over Canada, giving up five hits. In the gold medal game against Cuba, he pitched 8 innings, allowing two earned runs in a 3–2 victory.

In March 2009, he represented the South Korea national baseball team in the 2009 World Baseball Classic, where the team was the runner-up to the eventual champion, Japan. In 2010, Ryu played in the 2010 Asian Games, where the South Korea national baseball team won the gold medal in baseball. On May 11, 2010, Ryu became the first pitcher in history to strike out 17 batters in a nine-inning game, against the LG Twins at Cheongju Sports Complex Baseball Stadium.

In 2012, Ryu finished with a 2.66 ERA and 210 strikeouts, but earned only a 9–9 win–loss record and ten no decisions. Ryu repeatedly expressed his desire to play in the United States for Major League Baseball and scouts from many MLB teams visited Korea to see Ryu's pitching. Finally, on October 29, 2012, the Eagles announced that Ryu would be posted as early as November 1, 2012 to allow MLB teams to bid for the rights to negotiate with him.

Los Angeles Dodgers (2013–2019)
On November 9, 2012, the Eagles accepted the reported bid of $25.7M from the Los Angeles Dodgers, giving them a 30-day period to try to negotiate a contract with Ryu. On December 9, he was signed to a six-year, $36 million deal, that included the option to opt out after the 5th year if certain performance benchmarks were reached (750 innings pitched by year 5, an average of 150 innings/year).

2013

On March 17, 2013, Ryu recorded his first win as a Dodger, albeit, in a spring training game on St. Patrick's Day. He allowed just one run in  innings, and retired the final 11 men he faced. He struck out six and allowed just five to reach base.

Ryu made his Major League Baseball debut in a start against the San Francisco Giants on April 2, 2013. He allowed 10 hits in 6.1 innings but only one earned run. Ryu picked up his first Major League win on April 7 over the Pittsburgh Pirates. On April 13 against the Arizona Diamondbacks, he recorded his first major league hit with a double in the third inning. He wound up 3 for 3 at the plate in the game, the first Dodgers pitcher to get three hits in a game since Randy Wolf in 2009. This game was also his 100th career win, in South Korea and the U.S. combined.

On May 1, 2013, Ryu pitched six innings against the Colorado Rockies and struck out 12 batters, his highest strikeout count in an MLB game so far.

On May 28, 2013, Ryu pitched a complete game shutout against the Los Angeles Angels of Anaheim, striking out seven batters, walking none, and conceding only two hits. It was the first shutout in Ryu's MLB career and the first shutout for a Korean-born pitcher since Chan Ho Park and Sun-woo Kim. In 30 starts with the Dodgers in 2013, Ryu was 14–8 with a 3.00 ERA. He was selected by Baseball America to their annual "All-Rookie team".

On October 6, 2013, Ryu became the first South Korean to serve as the starting pitcher of a Major League Baseball postseason game.

2014
In his first start of the 2014 season in Sydney, Australia, Ryu held the D-backs scoreless in five innings of work. He proceeded to start 26 games for the Dodgers in 2014, despite missing time with various injuries. He finished 14–7 with a 3.38 ERA.

2015
Ryu began spring training with optimism that he would be able to pitch a career high 200 innings in 2015. However, he was shut down early in camp with back tightness, though he said he was not concerned by it.  When he started throwing again he experienced a sore shoulder and the Dodgers decided to shut him down for two weeks. Despite report that Ryu was  pain free in April, the Dodgers took precautions and placed him on the 60-day disabled list on May 4 in view of his  sporadic shoulder pain during the previous season. The Dodgers noted a lack of velocity in his bullpen session soon afterwards, and Ryu decided to have a surgery on his shoulder to alleviate the problem. On May 21, Ryu had a surgery to repair his left shoulder labrum and ended his chances of pitching during the 2015 season.

2016
Ryu eventually rejoined the Dodgers on July 7, 2016, and started against the San Diego Padres. He allowed eight hits, four of them for extra bases in 4 innings of a 6–0 loss. However, he reported elbow discomfort after the game and was placed back on the disabled list. On September 28, he underwent debridement surgery on his left elbow.

2017
After losing his first four decisions of the season, Ryu picked up his first major league win since the 2014 season on April 30, 2017 in a 5–3 win against the Philadelphia Phillies. On May 25, he pitched four scoreless innings out of the bullpen to pick up his first major league save in a 7–4 win against the St. Louis Cardinals. Ryu made 24 starts in 2017 for the Dodgers (and one relief appearance) and was 5–9 with a 3.77 ERA, 116 strikeouts and 45 walks.

2018
Ryu began the season 3–0 with a 2.12 ERA in 6 starts before landing on the disabled list with a groin injury. He was placed on the 60-day disabled list on June 2, 2018.  Overall, Ryu made 15 starts with the team, going 7–3 with 1.97 ERA, posting 85 strikeouts and 15 walks. On October 24, 2018, Ryu became the first Korean pitcher to start in a World Series game when he started in Game 2 of the series at Fenway Park in Boston. Ryu became a free agent after the season, but accepted the Dodgers one-year, $17.9 million, qualifying offer to remain with the club for 2019.

2019
Ryu was named the Dodgers opening day starter for the 2019 season after injuries to Clayton Kershaw and Rich Hill. On May 7, 2019, Ryu pitched his second career complete game shutout against the Atlanta Braves.  He struck out six, walked none, and gave up four hits in the 9–0 victory.  In his next start against the Washington Nationals on May 12, 2019, he had a no-hit bid before giving a double to Gerardo Parra in the eighth inning with one out.  He finished the game with 8 innings pitched, struck out nine, walked one, and gave up that one hit in a 6–0 win against the Washington Nationals. His two pitching performances earned him NL Player of the Week. He followed this performance with 7 shutout innings against the Cincinnati Reds on May 19, 2019, extending his streak of consecutive scoreless innings pitched to 31. This streak is tied for the tenth longest in Dodgers' history and is 28 fewer than the team record of 59 set by Orel Hershiser in 1988. Ryu won MLB Pitcher of the Month in May, going 5–0 with a 0.59 ERA, striking out 36 batters, walking 3 batters, while allowing three earned runs. He was selected to be the National League's starting pitcher for his first all-star appearance at the 2019 MLB All-Star Game. On September 22, Ryu hit his first career home run off of Antonio Senzatela of the Colorado Rockies. He finished the regular season with a record of 14–5, an MLB season-leading ERA of 2.32 and the lowest walks per nine innings ratio of 1.183. Ryu came in second in voting for the National League Cy Young Award.

Toronto Blue Jays (2020–present)
On December 27, 2019, Ryu signed a four-year, $80 million contract with the Toronto Blue Jays.

Due to the COVID-19 pandemic, the Blue Jays 2020 season did not begin until July 24. On this day, Ryu made his Blue Jays debut as the Opening Day starting pitcher, throwing 4 innings in Toronto's 6–4 victory over the Tampa Bay Rays. He would go on to finish the regular season with a 5–2 record over 12 starts with a 2.69 ERA over 62 innings pitched with 72 strikeouts & 17 walks. On September 24, 2020, in his final regular season start, Ryu became the first Blue Jays' starting pitcher in that season to pitch into the 7th inning & the second starter to throw 100 pitches, while also yielding 0 runs, 5 hits, & 2 walks, while compiling 4 strikeouts and the winning decision in a 4–1 victory over the New York Yankees to help clinch the Blue Jays' first postseason berth since 2016. He finished third in voting for the 2020 American League Cy Young award, and won the Warren Spahn Award, presented each season by the Oklahoma Sports Museum to the best left-handed pitcher in Major League Baseball (MLB).

Ryu made 31 starts for Toronto in 2021, pitching to a 14-10 record and 4.37 ERA with 143 strikeouts and 37 walks in 169.0 innings of work. In 2022, Ryu made 6 starts for the Blue Jays, limping to a 2-0 record and 5.67 ERA with 16 strikeouts in 27.0 innings pitched. On June 2, 2022, he was pulled from a start against the Chicago White Sox shortly after reaching 1,000 career innings pitched. He was later diagnosed with damage to his ulnar collateral ligament and underwent Tommy John surgery on June 18.

Pitching style

He throws a fastball sitting 89-92 mph (tops out at 95 mph), a cutter, a curveball, a slider, and a change-up. Scouts say that the change-up is his best pitch and is a legitimate out-pitch at the big league level. Ryu has also drawn attention for his ability to locate his pitches within the strike zone. He posted a BB/9 (walks per nine innings rate) of 2.0 in his MLB career.

Through the 2019 season, Ryu is the only pitcher born in Asia with a sub 3.00 career ERA (minimum of 500 innings pitched) in major league history.

Popularity

Ryu enjoys a popularity amongst South Korean baseball players, drawing South Korean fans as well as fans of Korean ancestry in nearly every stadium he pitches in. On July 22, 2013, after a 14–5 win against the Toronto Blue Jays played at Rogers Centre, several hundred fans of Korean ancestry stayed after the game to give Ryu a standing ovation, a common practice during the game, but a rarity for an ovation to occur after the game.

Ryu is so revered in South Korea that no Hanwha Eagles player has worn his no. 99 since he left for the major league in 2012.

Personal life
Ryu married Korean sports reporter Bae Ji-hyun on January 5, 2018. The wedding was officiated by Kim In-sik, Ryu's first manager at Hanwha. The couple announced on October 11, 2019 that they were expecting their first child. Their daughter was born on May 17, 2020. Later on July 24, 2022, announced his wife was pregnant with their second child. Their second child, a son, was born in Toronto on September 29, 2022.

In popular culture
 Ryu has appeared in Running Man, with Shin-Soo Choo on episode 119; Bae Suzy on ep 171, 172 and 173; with Kang Jung-ho on ep 227; and with Kwang-hyun Kim on ep 534.
 Ryu made a cameo in Mr. Go, a sport-comedy about a gorilla who becomes a baseball superstar.
 Ryu has appeared in Master in the house (South Korean TV series) on episode 152 and 153

International competition

See also

 List of Major League Baseball players from South Korea
 List of World Series starting pitchers
 Los Angeles Dodgers award winners and league leaders

References

External links

Career statistics and player information from Korea Baseball Organization

1987 births
Living people
Asian Games medalists in baseball
Asian Games bronze medalists for South Korea
Asian Games gold medalists for South Korea
Baseball players at the 2006 Asian Games
Baseball players at the 2010 Asian Games
Baseball players at the 2008 Summer Olympics
Buffalo Bisons (minor league) players
Hanwha Eagles players
KBO League Most Valuable Player Award winners
KBO League pitchers
KBO League Rookie of the Year Award winners
Los Angeles Dodgers players
Major League Baseball pitchers
Major League Baseball players from South Korea
Medalists at the 2006 Asian Games
Medalists at the 2010 Asian Games
Medalists at the 2008 Summer Olympics
National League All-Stars
National League ERA champions
Oklahoma City Dodgers players
Olympic baseball players of South Korea
Olympic gold medalists for South Korea
Olympic medalists in baseball
Rancho Cucamonga Quakes players
South Korean expatriate baseball players in the United States
Sportspeople from Incheon
Toronto Blue Jays players
2009 World Baseball Classic players
Ryu clan of Munhwa
South Korean expatriate baseball players in Canada